Love's Still Changing Hearts is the 34th studio album by Christian music vocal group The Imperials released in 1990. This is the first album recorded on the Star Song label. This album's personnel line-up consists of Armond Morales, David Will, Ron Hemby and David Robertson. Robertson replaced Jimmie Lee Sloas in 1989 but only for this album as he would leave the group for a solo career. This is also Ron Hemby's final album with the group as both Hemby and Robertson were replaced by new tenor leads Jonathan Pierce and Jason Beddoe. Beddoe replaced Hemby but he left the group but Pierce would stay on to record their next album. Former member Sloas co-wrote the track "Goin' Away." The album's final track is a near-9 minute medley of six of the Imperials' best beloved songs and a cover of "Gospel Ship" called "Platinum Medley." Love's Still Changing Hearts peaked at number 3 on the Billboard Top Christian Albums chart.

Track listing

Personnel 

The Imperials
 David Robertson - tenor, co-lead vocals
 Ron Hemby – tenor, co-lead vocals
 David Will – baritone, vocals
 Armond Morales – bass, vocals

Musicians
 Neil Artwick – synthesizers 
 Chris Cameron – synthesizers, Hammond B3 organ
 Morris "Butch" Stewart – synthesizers, sequencing, backing vocals, all arrangements 
 Thaddis "Kuk" Harrell – sequencing
 David Barrett – acoustic guitar 
 Billy Panda – acoustic guitar 
 Richie Davis – electric guitar 
 Peter Lerner – electric guitar 
 Ronald Hall – bass
 Wayne Stewart – drums 
 Steve Eisen – baritone saxophone, tenor saxophone 
 James Perkins – alto saxophone, tenor saxophone 
 Michael Halpin – trombone 
 Grant Cramer – trumpet 
 Mark Ohlsen – trumpet 
 Diane Louie – original arrangements (5, 6, 9)
 Kim Fleming – backing vocals, guest vocals (6)
 Vicki Hampton – backing vocals
 Jason Morales – backing vocals 
 Tanya Goodman-Sykes – backing vocals 

Production
 Jeff Moseley – executive producer 
 Armond Morales – executive producer 
 Morris "Butch" Stewart – producer 
 Paul Klingberg – recording 
 Larry Millas – recording 
 Nick Froome – mixing at Sixteenth Avenue Sound (Nashville, Tennessee)
 Scott Ahaus – second engineer 
 John David Parker – second engineer 
 Tom Russo – second engineer 
 Graham Lewis – third engineer 
 Georgetown Masters (Nashville, Tennessee) – mastering location 
 Jackson Design – art direction, design 
 Russ Harrington – photography

Charts

Year-end charts

Radio singles

References

1990 albums
The Imperials albums